Arthur Green (born 28 April 1928 – 1992) was a professional footballer, who played for Burscough, Huddersfield Town and Burton Albion. He was born in Liverpool.

References

1928 births
1992 deaths
English footballers
Association football defenders
English Football League players
Burscough F.C. players
Huddersfield Town A.F.C. players
Burton Albion F.C. players
Footballers from Liverpool